William Herbert Cam (1850-1927) was born on 10 November 1850, the son of William Cam of Durlsey, Gloucestershire.

William Herbert Cam was at Bedford School and a scholar of New College, Oxford. He was a master at Wellington College, headmaster of Dudley Grammar School (1897-83) and Abingdon School (1883-93).  He was then rector of Birchanger and rector of Paulerspury.

His daughter Helen Maud Cam (1885-1968) whom initially was educated by her father at School House, Abingdon School, became vice-mistress of Girton College, Cambridge (1944–48) and professor or mediaeval history at Harvard University (1948–54).

He died on 3 October 1927 aged 76.

References

1850 births
1927 deaths
Schoolteachers from Gloucestershire
Alumni of New College, Oxford
People educated at Bedford School
Heads of Abingdon School